Anantray Devshanker Dave (27 May 1938 – 7 October 2012) was an Indian politician from the state of Gujarat, who represented Kutch constituency in the 6th Lok Sabha and was a member of the Rajya Sabha from 1990 to 2002. Born in Mandvi, he served as a member of the Mandvi Municipality and chairman of Sardar Patel Jal Sanchay Nigam.

Personal life
Dave was born to Devshanker and Kashiben on 27 May 1938 in Mandvi, Kutch district. He completed his study of law from Gujarat University. He served as a lecturer in Sheth S.V.College. He married Indira Anant Dave on 11 December 1968. He has one son named Devang Dave and two daughters named Nehal Dave and Hetal Dave.

Political career
Dave started his political career in the Rashtriya Swayamsevak Sangh. He served as a member of the Mandvi municipality for two terms. He won the 1977 Indian general election from Kutch constituency (now known as Kachchh) as a Janata Party candidate, and became a member of the 6th Lok Sabha. He had defeated Indian National Congress' senior politician Mahipat Mehta, and rose to the status of "giant killer". He was detained under Maintenance of Internal Security Act for eleven months during the emergency. He represented Gujarat in the Rajya Sabha from 1990 to 2002. He actively participated in water conservation movement in the Kutch district, and as the chairman of the Sardar Patel Jal Sanchay Nigam, he was the "cornerstone" for building eleven thousand checks dams in Kutch.

Death
Dave died on 7 October 2012 after prolonged illness due to cancer. Narendra Modi expressed grief over his death, and said that he "played a key role in the development of Kutch". Vice President of India Hamid Ansari said that "the country has lost a noted social worker and able parliamentarian". Parsottambhai Rupala and Keshubhai Patel also expressed grief over his death.

References

1938 births
2012 deaths
Rajya Sabha members from Gujarat
Bharatiya Janata Party politicians from Gujarat
India MPs 1977–1979
Lok Sabha members from Gujarat
People from Mandvi
Gujarat University alumni
Deaths from cancer in India
Rajya Sabha members from the Bharatiya Janata Party
Janata Party politicians
Politicians from Kutch district